El Maffa (also written El Maja) is a village in the commune of El Ouata, Béchar Province, Algeria. It is connected to El Ouata by a local road along the side of the river, along with the other villages Ammas, Aguedal and El Beïda.

References 

Neighbouring towns and cities

Populated places in Béchar Province